Barbara Mason (born August 9, 1947, in Philadelphia, Pennsylvania, United States) is an American soul singer with several R&B and pop hits in the 1960s and 1970s, best known for her self-written 1965 hit song "Yes, I'm Ready". She has released 12 albums, including her 1965 debut with Yes, I'm Ready, and has had 14 top 40 hits on the US Billboard R&B chart.

Career
Mason initially focused on songwriting when she entered the music industry in her teens. As a performer she had a major hit single with her third release in 1965, "Yes, I'm Ready" (number 5 pop, number 2 R&B). She had modest success throughout the rest of the decade on the small Arctic label, run by her manager Jimmy Bishop. She reached the U.S. Billboard Hot 100 top 40 again in 1965 with "Sad, Sad Girl", and "Oh How It Hurts" in 1967. A two-year stay with National General Records, run by a film production company, produced one album and four singles which failed to find success.

In the 1970s, Mason signed to Buddah Records. She toughened her persona, singing about sexual love and infidelity with an uncommon frankness at the time in songs like "Bed and Board", "From His Woman to You", and "Shackin' Up" and would interrupt her singing to deliver straight-talking 'raps' about romance. She also continued to write some of her new material. Curtis Mayfield produced her on a cover version of Mayfield's own "Give Me Your Love", which restored her to the pop top 40 and R&B top ten in 1973; "From His Woman to You" (the response to Shirley Brown's single "Woman to Woman") and "Shackin' Up", produced by former Stax producer Don Davis in Detroit were also solid soul sellers in the mid-1970s.

Mason also sang vocals on the tracks "Sheba Baby," "I'm in Love with You," "A Good Man Is Gone," and "She Did It" on the soundtrack for the 1975 Pam Grier film, Sheba, Baby.

After leaving Buddah Records in 1975 after two top ten R&B hits, she only dented the charts periodically on small labels. They included "I Am Your Woman, She Is Your Wife", which was produced in 1978 by Weldon McDougal who had produced her first major success, "Yes I'm Ready", and later in 1984, "Another Man" on West End Records.

Mason started to concentrate on running her own publishing company in the late 1980s. She released a new CD, Feeling Blue, in September 2007. Mason was still performing to sold-out audiences in 2016. Her most recent show was at the Terrance Theater in Long Beach, California. Mason was inducted into the Soul Music Hall of Fame on March 1, 2016.

Discography

Studio albums

Singles

References

External links
 
 
 Barbara Mason on Soul Patrol
 Barbara Mason Page
 Barbara Mason Myspace Page

1947 births
Living people
Musicians from Philadelphia
American soul singers
American women singers
West End Records artists
Jamie Records artists
Singers from Pennsylvania
21st-century American women